The name Doreen has been used for five tropical cyclones in the Eastern Pacific Ocean.
 Hurricane Doreen (1962)
 Tropical Storm Doreen (1965)
 Hurricane Doreen (1969)
 Hurricane Doreen (1973)
 Hurricane Doreen (1977)

See also 
 List of storms named Dorian, a similar name which has been used in the Atlantic Ocean.
 List of storms named Durian, a similar name which been used in the northwestern Pacific Ocean.

Pacific hurricane set index articles